The 1899 Navy Midshipmen football team represented the United States Naval Academy during the 1899 college football season. In their third season under head coach Bill Armstrong, the Midshipmen compiled a 5–3 record, shut out five opponents, and outscored all opponents by a combined score of 94 to 27.

Schedule

References

Navy
Navy Midshipmen football seasons
Navy Midshipmen football